Tribbey is a town in Pottawatomie County, Oklahoma, United States.The community was named for Alpheus M. Tribbey, landowner. The population was 391 at the 2010 census, a 43.2 percent gain from the figure of 273 in 2000.

Geography
Tribbey is located at  (35.092740, -97.091787).

Demographics

As of the census of 2000, there were 273 people, 102 households, and 84 families living in the town. The population density was 14.3 people per square mile (5.5/km2). There were 115 housing units at an average density of 6.0 per square mile (2.3/km2). The racial makeup of the town was 91.21% White, 3.30% Native American, and 5.49% from two or more races. Hispanic or Latino of any race were 2.20% of the population.

There were 102 households, out of which 24.5% had children under the age of 18 living with them, 72.5% were married couples living together, 6.9% had a female householder with no husband present, and 17.6% were non-families. 16.7% of all households were made up of individuals, and 8.8% had someone living alone who was 65 years of age or older. The average household size was 2.68 and the average family size was 2.99.

In the town, the population was spread out, with 24.2% under the age of 18, 5.5% from 18 to 24, 24.2% from 25 to 44, 33.7% from 45 to 64, and 12.5% who were 65 years of age or older. The median age was 42 years. For every 100 females, there were 105.3 males. For every 100 females age 18 and over, there were 99.0 males.

The median income for a household in the town was $33,125, and the median income for a family was $40,000. Males had a median income of $30,962 versus $21,875 for females. The per capita income for the town was $13,846. None of the families and 0.4% of the population were living below the poverty line.

References

Oklahoma City metropolitan area
Towns in Pottawatomie County, Oklahoma
Towns in Oklahoma